Oscar di Lovera (born 12 October 1958) is an Argentine biathlete. He competed in the 10 km sprint event at the 1984 Winter Olympics.

References

External links
 

1958 births
Living people
Argentine male biathletes
Olympic biathletes of Argentina
Biathletes at the 1984 Winter Olympics
People from Esquel